Zinc finger matrin-type 4 is a protein that in humans is encoded by the ZMAT4 gene.

References

Further reading